Echis khosatzkii is a species of viper. Like all other vipers, it is venomous.

Geographic range
The snake is found in Oman and eastern Yemen.

References

Reptiles described in 1990
Reptiles of the Arabian Peninsula
Viperinae